Phyllonorycter rostrispinosa is a moth of the family Gracillariidae. It is known from the islands of Kyūshū and Honshū in Japan.

The wingspan is about 5.5 mm.

The larvae feed on Quercus serrata, Quercus acutissima and Quercus variabilis. They mine the leaves of their host plant. The mine has the form of a ptychonomous leaf mine, situated between two veins on the underside of the leaf.

References

rostrispinosa
Moths of Japan
Moths described in 1967